The 2016 Categoría Primera A season (officially known as the 2016 Liga Águila season for sponsorship reasons) was the 69th season of Colombia's top-flight football league. Atlético Nacional came in as the defending champions having won the title in the 2015 season's Finalización tournament.

20 teams competed against one another, eighteen returning from last season plus Atlético Bucaramanga and Fortaleza, who were promoted from the 2015 Primera B and will be returning to the top tier after 7 years and 1 year, respectively, replacing Uniautónoma and Cúcuta Deportivo who were relegated at the end of the last season.

Independiente Medellín won its sixth title in the Torneo Apertura after beating Junior in the finals, while in the Torneo Finalización Santa Fe won its ninth title after beating Deportes Tolima in the finals.

Format
The league retained the format used in the most recent season. The Apertura and Finalización tournaments were divided into three stages: a First Stage which was contested on a single round-robin basis, with each team playing the other teams once and playing a regional rival once more for a total of 20 matches. The top eight teams after the twenty rounds advanced to a knockout round, where they were pitted into four ties to be played on a home-and-away basis, with the four winners advancing to the semifinals and the winner of each semifinal advancing to the final of the tournament, which was played on a home-and-away basis as well. The winner of the final in each tournament was declared the tournament champion and will participate in the 2017 Copa Libertadores.

Teams

Stadia and locations 

a: Temporarily plays its home games at Estadio Álvaro Gómez Hurtado in Floridablanca due to remodeling works at Estadio Alfonso López.
b: Temporarily played its home games at Estadio Manuel Murillo Toro in Ibagué due to the temporary closure of Estadio Guillermo Plazas Alcid.
c: Plays Sunday evening home games at Estadio Pascual Guerrero in Cali.
d: Temporarily played its home games at Estadio Metropolitano de Techo due to remodeling works at Estadio El Campín.
e: Formerly known as Águilas Doradas.

Torneo Apertura

First stage
The First Stage began on 29 January and consisted of twenty rounds including a series of regional rivalries in the tenth round. It ended on 29 May with the top eight teams at the end of this stage advancing to the knockout stage.

Standings

Results

Knockout phase bracket

Quarterfinals

Semifinals

Finals

Top goalscorers

Source: DIMAYOR

Torneo Finalización

First stage
The First Stage began on 1 July and featured the same format used in the Torneo Apertura, with reversed fixtures. It ended on 20 November with the top eight teams at the end of this stage advancing to the knockout stage.

Standings

Results

Knockout phase bracket

Quarterfinals

Semifinals

Finals

Top goalscorers

Source: DIMAYOR

Relegation
A separate table is kept to determine the teams that get relegated to the Categoría Primera B for the next season. The table includes an average of all first stage games played for the current season and the previous two seasons. For purposes of elaborating the table, the promoted teams are given the same point and goal tallies as the team in the 18th position at the start of the season.

Source: DIMAYORRules for classification: 1st average; 2nd goal difference; 3rd number of goals scored; 4th away goals scored.

Aggregate table

References

External links 
 DIMAYOR's official website 

Categoría Primera A seasons
Categoria Primera A season
1